Condy was a drinking vessel made of silver or gold. Sometimes it was used by ancient Greeks and according to some authors its origin was Persian, while according to others Cappadocian. Menander, quoted by Athenaeus, speaks of a golden condy holding ten cotylae.

In the Book of Genesis the Hebrew word, which is translated scyphus (σκύφος) by Aquila and Vulgate, phiale (φιάλη) by Symmachus, is translated as κόνδυ in the old Alexandrine version, and the same word is used in Isaiah 51.17 and 22.

References 

Ancient Greek pot shapes
Wine accessories